The Midlanders is a 1920 American silent drama film starring Bessie Love and directed by husband and wife duo Joseph De Grasse and Ida May Park. It was produced by Andrew J. Callaghan Productions and distributed by Federated Film Exchanges of America. It is based on the 1912 novel of the same name by Charles Tenney Jackson, published by Bobbs-Merrill Company.

Only a small fragment of this film is known to survive.

Cast

Production 

Interiors were filmed in a studio in Los Angeles, and exteriors were filmed in Rio Vista. To prepare for her performance, Bessie Love took dance classes at Theodore Kosloff's ballet school.

After its release, producer Andrew J. Callaghan sued Federated Film Exchanges, saying that the distributor had not paid the full amount to distribute this film, Bonnie May, and Penny of Top Hill Trail.

Reception 

The film received mixed reviews, but Love's performance was highly praised.

References

External links 

 
 
 
 
 

1920 films
1920 drama films
1920 lost films
American black-and-white films
Silent American drama films
American silent feature films
Films based on American novels
Films directed by Ida May Park
Films directed by Joseph De Grasse
Lost American films
Lost drama films
1920s American films